Hankensbüttel is a municipality in the Samtgemeinde Hankensbüttel in the district of Gifhorn, Lower Saxony, Germany. It is situated approximately 25 km south of Uelzen, and 30 km north of Gifhorn. The Municipality Hankensbüttel includes the villages of Alt Isenhagen, Emmen and Hankensbüttel,

History
The first documentary mentioning of Hankensbüttel was in the year 1051 by the name Honengesbuthele. The document is from Henry III. In this time the Saxon dynasty of Billung owned the region

Politics

Administration
Hankensbüttel is also the seat of the Samtgemeinde Hankensbüttel ("collective municipality"), which consists of the following municipalities:
Dedelstorf
Hankensbüttel
Obernholz
Sprakensehl
Steinhorst

Community council
The Community council consists of 15 community members and was elected on 10 September 2006:
 CDU - 7 Seats
 SPD - 2 Seats
 Green Party - 2 Seats
 FDP - 2 Seats
 Independent - 2 Seats

References

Gifhorn (district)